Eugenijus Riabovas (born 3 February 1951) is a Lithuanian football manager.

Playing career
Prior to his coaching career, Riabovas played for Žalgiris Vilnius and 3 times was named as Best Footballer of Lithuania. Riabovas was once the captain of the Lithuanian SSR football team during the USSR era.

Managerial career
He was recently the manager of A Lyga side FBK Kaunas.

In November 2006 he was briefly attached to Scottish Premier League football club Heart of Midlothian FC, in an advisory capacity. On 14 November 2006 it was speculated by the Scottish press that Riabovas would be the replacement for temporary head coach Eduard Malofeev, but this was later denied and did not take place, with Valdas Ivanauskas returning to take up the position, following a period of illness.

References

External links
Profile at KLISF
Profile at Futbolinis.lt

1951 births
Living people
Soviet footballers
Lithuanian footballers
Lithuanian football managers
FK Atlantas players
FK Žalgiris players
FK Žalgiris managers
Association football midfielders
FBK Kaunas managers
Lithuanian people of Russian descent